The second season of My Name Is Earl originally aired from September 21, 2006, to May 10, 2007. The season consisted of 23 episodes. The DVD was originally released on September 25, 2007. Its bonus material included deleted scenes, commentary tracks on selected episodes, as well as other features.

Unlike the previous season, there was a loose story arc, in which Joy steals a truck and accidentally kidnaps a man inside it. As this was her third strike, Joy faces life imprisonment, leading to her trial in the season finale.

Characters
 Jason Lee as Earl Hickey
 Jamie Pressly as Joy Turner
 Ethan Suplee as Randy Hickey
 Nadine Velazquez as Catalina
 Eddie Steeples as Darnell Turner

List of episodes

Home media
20th Century Fox Home Entertainment produces and distributes season 2.

References

External links
 My Name Is Earl (season 2) at Metacritic

My Name Is Earl
2006 American television seasons
2007 American television seasons